The current coat of arms of Syria or coat of arms of the Syrian Arab Republic was adopted in 1980, following the 1977 dissolution of the Federation of Arab Republics, whose coat of arms had until then been used by its constituent states. This emblem consist of the Hawk of Quraish supporting a shield bearing the national flag of Syria (in vertical form), and a scroll of the words "Syrian Arab Republic". Since the start of the ongoing Syrian Civil War in March 2011, alternative coats of arms have been created by the Syrian opposition and the Federation of Northern Syria.

History

Since the declaration of the Syrian Republic on 14 May 1930, Syria has had several coats of arms, albeit fairly consistent in composition - a supporter (often the Hawk of Quraish) bearing a shield, with the official Arabic name of the territory on a scroll beneath.

During Syria's union with Egypt in the United Arab Republic (UAR) between 1958 and 1961, the pan-Arab Eagle of Saladin was used as the basis of the coat of arms. Though Syria withdrew from the union in 1961, Egypt continued to use the official name, flag, and coat of arms of the UAR until 1971. Syria reverted to the coat of arms used before the UAR, inverting the colours of the mullets and the orle two years later.

During the period of the Federation of Arab Republics between 1972 and 1977, a loose association of Egypt, Libya, and Syria, the Hawk of Quraish was used as the coat of arms.

After the end of the union, all three former member states retained the Hawk of Quraish. Egypt finally reverted to the Eagle of Saladin in 1984, which had served as the coat of arms of both Egypt and Libya prior to the abortive union, and which still serves as the basis of the in this arms of Egypt, Iraq, and Palestine. Syria continued to use the Hawk of Quraish, as did Libya under Gaddafi (although the Libyan version faced to the dexter rather than to the sinister, as in the Syrian version).

Gallery

See also
Flag of Syria
Coat of arms of the United Arab Republic
Coat of arms of Iraq
Coat of arms of Palestine
Coat of arms of Egypt
Coat of arms of Sudan
Coat of arms of Libya
Coat of arms of Yemen

References

Syria
National symbols of Syria
Syria
Syria